Fort McKinley is an unincorporated community in Harrison Township in Montgomery County, Ohio, United States. It was delineated as a census-designated place (CDP) at the 2000 census, when its population was 3,989. It was not delineated as a CDP for the 2010 census.

Fort McKinley is part of the Dayton Metropolitan Statistical Area.

Fort McKinley was platted in 1914.

Geography
Fort McKinley is located at  (39.799407, -84.248741).

Demographics

As of the census of 2000, there were 3,989 people, 1,587 households, and 1,068 families residing in the CDP. The population density was 2,994.3 people per square mile (1,158.0/km2). There were 1,713 housing units at an average density of 1,285.9/sq mi (497.3/km2). The racial makeup of the CDP was 43.44% White, 53.17% African American, 0.18% Native American, 0.35% Asian, 0.55% from other races, and 2.31% from two or more races. Hispanic or Latino of any race were 0.65% of the population.

There were 1,587 households, out of which 31.3% had children under the age of 18 living with them, 39.3% were married couples living together, 23.6% had a female householder with no husband present, and 32.7% were non-families. 28.2% of all households were made up of individuals, and 9.8% had someone living alone who was 65 years of age or older. The average household size was 2.47 and the average family size was 3.00.

In the CDP the population was spread out, with 26.6% under the age of 18, 7.6% from 18 to 24, 30.1% from 25 to 44, 21.9% from 45 to 64, and 13.7% who were 65 years of age or older. The median age was 37 years. For every 100 females, there were 85.6 males. For every 100 females age 18 and over, there were 81.3 males.

The median income for a household in the CDP was $31,933, and the median income for a family was $41,490. Males had a median income of $28,224 versus $25,903 for females. The per capita income for the CDP was $16,155. About 10.3% of families and 15.4% of the population were below the poverty line, including 24.4% of those under age 18 and 12.0% of those age 65 or over.

References

Unincorporated communities in Montgomery County, Ohio
Unincorporated communities in Ohio